Q'ara Qullu (Aymara q'ara bare, bald, qullu mountain, "bare mountain", also spelled Khara Khollu, Khara Kkollu) is a  mountain in the Bolivian Andes. It is located in the La Paz Department, Loayza Province, Luribay Municipality. Q'ara Qullu lies southwest of Suka Sukani, northwest of Urqu Jipiña and southeast of K'ark'ani. The little lake northwest of Q'ara Qullu is Wila Quta ("red lake").

References 

Mountains of La Paz Department (Bolivia)